Francesco Andrea Grassi (1661–1712) was a Roman Catholic prelate who served as Bishop of Caorle (1700–1712).

Biography
Francesco Andrea Grassi was born in Chioggia, Italy on 19 May 1661. On 30 March 1700, he was appointed during the papacy of Pope Innocent XII as Bishop of Caorle. On 9 May 1700, he was consecrated bishop by Daniello Marco Delfino, Bishop of Brescia, with Prospero Bottini, Titular Archbishop of Myra, and Marco Giustiniani, Bishop of Torcello, serving as co-consecrators. He served as Bishop of Caorle until his death in January 1712.

References

18th-century Roman Catholic bishops in the Republic of Venice
Bishops appointed by Pope Innocent XII
1661 births
1712 deaths